Ubykh or Päkhy was a Northwest Caucasian language once spoken by the Ubykh tribe of Circassians who originally lived along the eastern coast of the Black Sea before being deported en masse to Turkey in the Circassian genocide.

The Ubykh language was ergative and polysynthetic, with a high degree of agglutination, with polypersonal verbal agreement and a very large number of distinct consonants but only two phonemically distinct vowels. With around eighty consonants, it had one of the largest inventories of consonants in the world, and the largest number for any language without clicks. 

It is known in linguistic literature by many names: variants of Ubykh, such as Ubikh,  (French); and its Germanised variant  (from Ubykh ).

Major features

Ubykh is distinguished by the following features, some of which are shared with other Northwest Caucasian languages:

 It is ergative, making no syntactic distinction between the subject of an intransitive sentence and the direct object of a transitive sentence. Split ergativity plays only a small part, if at all.
 It is highly agglutinating and polysynthetic, using mainly monosyllabic or bisyllabic roots, but with single morphological words sometimes reaching nine or more syllables in length:  ('if only you had not been able to make him take [it] all out from under me again for them'). Affixes rarely fuse in any way.
 It has a simple nominal system, contrasting just three noun cases, and not always marking grammatical number in the direct case.
 Its system of verbal agreement is quite complex. English verbs must agree only with the subject; Ubykh verbs must agree with the subject, the direct object and the indirect object, and benefactive objects must also be marked in the verb.
 It is phonologically complex as well, with 84 distinct consonants (four of which, however, appear only in loan words). It has three phonemic vowels [ɐ ɜ ɨ] which correspond to Dumézil's [aa a ə] respectively and this is evident in the minimal triplet of /ɐsʃɨn/ ('I milk X'), /ɐsʃɜn/ ('I reap X'), and /ɐsʃɐn/ ('I milk them; I reap them').

Phonology 

Ubykh has 84 phonemic consonants, a record high amongst languages without click consonants, but only 3 phonemic vowels. Four of these consonants are found only in loanwords and onomatopoeiae. There are nine basic places of articulation for the consonants and extensive use of secondary articulation, such that Ubykh has 20 different uvular phonemes. Ubykh distinguishes three types of postalveolar consonants: apical, laminal, and laminal closed. Regarding the vowels, since there are only three phonemic vowels, there is a great deal of allophony.

Grammar

Morphosyntax 

Ubykh is agglutinative and polysynthetic:  ('we will not be able to go back'),  ('if you had said it'). It is often extremely concise in its word forms.

The boundaries between nouns and verbs is somewhat blurred. Any noun can be used as the root of a stative verb ( 'child',  'I was a child'), and many verb roots can become nouns simply by the use of noun affixes ( 'to say',  'what I say').

Nouns 
The noun system in Ubykh is quite simple. It has three main noun cases (the oblique-ergative case may be two homophonous cases with differing function, thus presenting four cases in total):
 direct or absolutive case, marked with the bare root; this indicates the subject of an intransitive sentence and the direct object of a transitive sentence (e.g.  'a man')
 oblique-ergative case, marked in -; this indicates either the subject of a transitive sentence, targets of preverbs, or indirect objects which do not take any other suffixes ( '(to) a child')
 locative case, marked in -, which is the equivalent of English in, on or at.
There are X other cases that exist in Ubykh too:

 instrumental case (-) was also treated as a case in Dumézil (1975). 
 instrumental-comitative case (-).
 Another pair of postpositions, - ('to[wards]') and - ('for'), have been noted as synthetic datives (e.g.  'I will send it to the prince'), but their status as cases is also best discounted.

Nouns do not distinguish grammatical gender. 'the man'). There is no indefinite article directly equivalent to the English a or an, but -(root)- (literally 'one'-(root)-'certain') translates French un : e.g. ('a certain young man').

Number is only marked on the noun in the ergative case, with -. The number marking of the absolutive argument is either by suppletive verb roots (e.g.  'he is in the car' vs.  'they are in the car') or by verb suffixes:  ('he goes'),  ('they go'). The second person plural prefix - triggers this plural suffix regardless of whether that prefix represents the ergative, the absolutive, or an oblique argument: 
Absolutive:  ('I give you all to him')
Oblique:  ('he gives me to you all')
Ergative:  ('you all give it/them to me')
Note that, in this last sentence, the plurality of it (-) is obscured; the meaning can be either 'You all give it to me' or 'You all give them to me'.

Adjectives do not decline.

Postpositions are rare; most locative semantic functions, as well as some non-local ones, are provided with preverbal elements:  ('you wrote it for me'). However, there are a few postpositions:  ('like me'),  ('near the prince').

Pronouns 
Free pronouns in all North-West Caucasian languages lack an ergative-absolutive distinction.

Possession 

Possessed nouns have their plurality marked with the affix .

Verbs 

A pastpresentfuture distinction of verb tense exists (the suffixes - and - represent past and future) and an imperfective aspect suffix is also found (-, which can combine with tense suffixes). Dynamic and stative verbs are contrasted, as in Arabic, and verbs have several nominal forms. Morphological causatives are not uncommon.
- 'and' (free particle , borrowed from Arabic);
- 'but' (free particle )

Pronominal benefactives are also part of the verbal complex, marked with the preverb -, but a benefactive cannot normally appear on a verb that has three agreement prefixes already.

Gender only appears as part of the second person paradigm, and then only at the speaker's discretion. The feminine second person index is -, which behaves like other pronominal prefixes:  ('he gives [it] to you [normal; gender-neutral] for me'), but compare  'he gives [it] to you [feminine] for me').

Agreement 
Oblique 1 markers are limited to marking the agreement of a noun before a relational preverb and Oblique 2 markers are used for not only marking agreement with local and directional preverbs but also the simple oblique, or dative, arguments. 

The second-person  is an archaic pronoun used to indicate that the person being referred to is a female, or heckling the speaker in some way.

Dynamic Verb Conjugation 
Dynamic Ubykh verbs are split up in two groups: Group I which contain the simple tenses and Group II which contain derived counterpart tenses. Only the Karaclar dialect uses the progressive tense and the plural is unknown.

The singular-plural distinction is used when the subject, the ergative, is singular or plural.

Square brackets indicate elided vowels; parenthesis indicate optional parts of the stem; and the colon indicates the boundary of a morpheme.

Simple Past 
The verbs in the simple past tense are conjugated with - in the singular and - in the plural.

Examples:

  - to say →  (s)he said
  - to eat →  (s)he ate
  - to know →  (s)he knew
  - to go →  (s)he went

Mirative Past 
The verbs in the mirative past tense are conjugated with - in the singular and - in the plural.

Examples:

  - to say →  (s)he said apparently
  - to eat →  (s)he ate apparently
  - to know →  (s)he knew apparently
  - to go →  (s)he went apparently

Present 
The verbs in the present tense are conjugated with - in the singular and - in the plural.

Examples:

  - to say →  (s)he says
  - to eat →  (s)he eats
  - to know →  (s)he knows 
  - to go →  (s)he goes

Future I 
The verbs in the present tense are conjugated with - in the singular and - in the plural. It conveys a sense of certainty, immediacy, obligation, or intentionality.

Examples:

  - to say →  (s)he certainly will say
  - to eat →  (s)he certainly will eat
  - to know →  (s)he certainly will know 
  - to go →  (s)he certainly will go

Future II 
The verbs in the present tense are conjugated with - in the singular and - in the plural. It conveys a generic sense of the future as well as an exhortative sense such as:  (let's go!).

Examples:

  - to say →  (s)he will say
  - to eat →  (s)he will eat
  - to know →  (s)he will know 
  - to go →  (s)he will go

Static Verb Conjugation 
In all dialects and speakers, only two static tenses exist: present and past.

Aspect 
There are five basic aspects that exist besides the aspects that exist within the Ubykh tense system. They are: habitual, iterative, exhaustive, excessive, and potential.

A speaker may combine one of these aspects with another to convey more complex aspects in conjunction with the tenses. 

A few meanings covered in English by adverbs or auxiliary verbs are given in Ubykh by verb suffixes:
 ('I can eat it') -  ('I can drink it')
 ('I eat it all the time') -  ('I drink it all the time')
 ('I am eating it all up') -  ('I am drinking it all up')
 ('I eat it too much') -  ('I drink it too much')
 ('I eat it again') -  ('I drink it again')

Questions 
Questions may be marked grammatically, using verb suffixes or prefixes:

Yesno questions with -: ? ('did you see that?')
Complex questions with -: ? ('what is your name?')

Other types of questions, involving the pronouns 'where' and 'what', may also be marked only in the verbal complex:  ('where are you going?'),  ('what had you said?').

Preverbs and determinants 
Many local, prepositional, and other functions are provided by preverbal elements providing a large series of applicatives, and here Ubykh shows remarkable complexity. Two main types of preverbal elements exist: determinants and preverbs. The number of preverbs is limited, and mainly show location and direction. The number of determinants is also limited, but the class is more open; some determinant prefixes include - ('with regard to a horse') and - ('with regard to the foot or base of an object').

For simple locations, there are a number of possibilities that can be encoded with preverbs, including (but not limited to):
 above and touching
 above and not touching
 below and touching
 below and not touching
 at the side of
 through a space
 through solid matter
 on a flat horizontal surface
 on a non-horizontal or vertical surface
 in a homogeneous mass
 towards
 in an upward direction
 in a downward direction
 into a tubular space
 into an enclosed space
There is also a separate directional preverb meaning 'towards the speaker': -, which occupies a separate slot in the verbal complex. However, preverbs can have meanings that would take up entire phrases in English. The preverb - signifies 'on the earth' or 'in the earth', for instance:  ('they buried his body'; literally, "they put his body in the earth"). Even more narrowly, the preverb - signifies that an action is done out of, into or with regard to a fire:  ('I take a brand out of the fire').

Orthography 
Writing systems for the Ubykh language have been proposed, but there has never been a standard written form.

Lexicon

Native vocabulary 
Ubykh syllables have a strong tendency to be CV, although VC and CVC also exist. Consonant clusters are not as large as in Abzhywa Abkhaz or in Georgian, rarely being larger than two terms.
Compounding plays a large part in Ubykh and, indeed, in all Northwest Caucasian semantics.

Roots and affixes can be as small as one phoneme. The word , 'they give you to him', for instance, contains six phonemes, each a separate morpheme:

 - 2nd singular absolutive
 - 3rd singular dative
 - 3rd ergative
 - to give 
 - ergative plural
 - present tense

However, some words may be as long as seven syllables (although these are usually compounds):  ('staircase').

Slang and idioms 
As with all other languages, Ubykh is replete with idioms. The word  ('door'), for instance, is an idiom meaning either "magistrate", "court", or "government." However, idiomatic constructions are even more common in Ubykh than in most other languages; the representation of abstract ideas with series of concrete elements is a characteristic of the Northwest Caucasian family. As mentioned above, the phrase meaning "I love you" translates literally as 'I see you well'; similarly, "you please me" is literally 'you cut my heart'. The term  ('Russian'), an Arabic loan, has come to be a slang term meaning "infidel", "non-Muslim" or "enemy" (see History below).

Foreign loans 
The majority of loanwords in Ubykh are derived from either Adyghe or Arabic, with smaller numbers from Persian, Abkhaz, and the South Caucasian languages. Towards the end of Ubykh's life, a large influx of Adyghe words was noted; Vogt (1963) notes a few hundred examples. The phonemes  were borrowed from Arabic and Adyghe.  also appears to come from Adyghe, although it seems to have arrived earlier on. It is possible, too, that  is a loan from Adyghe, since most of the few words with this phoneme are obvious Adyghe loans:  ('proud'),  ('testis').

Many loanwords have Ubykh equivalents, but were dwindling in usage under the influence of Arabic, Circassian, and Russian equivalents:
  ('to make a hole in, to perforate' from Iranic languages) = 
  ('tea' from Chinese) = 
  ('enemy' from Persian) = 

Evolution 

In the scheme of Northwest Caucasian evolution, despite its parallels with Adyghe and Abkhaz, Ubykh forms a separate third branch of the family. It has fossilised palatal class markers where all other Northwest Caucasian languages preserve traces of an original labial class: the Ubykh word for 'heart', corresponds to the reflex  in Abkhaz, Abaza, Adyghe, and Kabardian. Ubykh also possesses groups of pharyngealised consonants. All other NWC languages possess true pharyngeal consonants, but Ubykh is the only language to use pharyngealisation as a feature of secondary articulation.

With regard to the other languages of the family, Ubykh is closer to Adyghe and Kabardian but shares many features with Abkhaz due to geographic influence; many later Ubykh speakers were bilingual in Ubykh and Adyghe.

Dialects 
While not many dialects of Ubykh existed, one divergent dialect of Ubykh has been noted (in Dumézil 1965:266-269). Grammatically, it is similar to standard Ubykh (i.e. Tevfik Esenç's dialect), but has a very different sound system, which had collapsed into just 62-odd phonemes:
  have collapsed into .
  seems to have disappeared.
 Pharyngealisation is no longer distinctive, having been replaced in many cases by geminate consonants.
 Palatalisation of the uvular consonants is no longer phonemic.

History 
Ubykh was spoken in the eastern coast of the Black Sea around Sochi until 1864, when the Ubykhs were driven out of the region by the Russians. They eventually came to settle in Turkey, founding the villages of Hacı Osman, Kırkpınar, Masukiye and Hacı Yakup. Arabic and Circassian eventually became the preferred languages for everyday communication, and many words from these languages entered Ubykh in that period.

The Ubykh language died out on 7 October 1992, when its last fluent speaker, Tevfik Esenç, died. Before his death, thousands of pages of material and many audio recordings had been collected and collated by a number of linguists, including Georges Charachidzé, Georges Dumézil, Hans Vogt, George Hewitt and A. Sumru Özsoy, with the help of some of its last speakers, particularly Tevfik Esenç and Huseyin Kozan. Ubykh was never written by its speech community, but a few phrases were transcribed by Evliya Çelebi in his Seyahatname and a substantial portion of the oral literature, along with some cycles of the Nart saga, was transcribed. Tevfik Esenç also eventually learned to write Ubykh in the transcription that Dumézil devised.

Julius von Mészáros, a Hungarian linguist, visited Turkey in 1930 and took down some notes on Ubykh. His work Die Päkhy-Sprache was extensive and accurate to the extent allowed by his transcription system (which could not represent all the phonemes of Ubykh) and marked the foundation of Ubykh linguistics.

The Frenchman Georges Dumézil also visited Turkey in 1930 to record some Ubykh and would eventually become the most celebrated Ubykh linguist. He published a collection of Ubykh folktales in the late 1950s, and the language soon attracted the attention of linguists for its small number of phonemic vowels. Hans Vogt, a Norwegian, produced a monumental dictionary that, in spite of its many errors (later corrected by Dumézil), is still one of the masterpieces and essential tools of Ubykh linguistics.

Later in the 1960s and into the early 1970s, Dumézil published a series of papers on Ubykh etymology in particular and Northwest Caucasian etymology in general. Dumézil's book Le Verbe Oubykh (1975), a comprehensive account of the verbal and nominal morphology of the language, is another cornerstone of Ubykh linguistics.

Since the 1980s, Ubykh linguistics has slowed drastically with the most recent treatise being Fenwick's A Grammar of Ubykh (2011), who was also working on a dictionary. The Ubykh themselves have shown interest in relearning their language.

The Abkhaz writer Bagrat Shinkuba's historical novel Bagrat Shinkuba. The Last of the Departed treats the fate of the Ubykh people.

People who have published literature on Ubykh include
 Brian George Hewitt
 Brian Fell
 Catherine Paris
 Christine Leroy
 Georg Bossong
 Georges Dumézil
 Hans Vogt
 John Colarusso
 Julius von Mészáros
 Rieks Smeets
 Rhona (formerly Rohan) Fenwick
 Tevfik Esenç
 Viacheslav Chirikba
 Wim Lucassen

Notable characteristics
Ubykh had been cited in the Guinness Book of Records (1996 ed.) as the language with the most consonant phonemes, but since 2017 the !Xóõ language (a member of the Tuu languages) has been considered by the book to have broken that record, with 130 consonants. Ubykh has 20 uvular and 29 pure fricative phonemes, more than any other known language.

Samples
All examples from Dumézil 1968.

Notes

Notes 

See also
North Caucasian languages

References

Bibliography
 Viacheslav Chirikba (1986). Abxazskie leksicheskie zaimstvovanija v ubyxskom jazyke (Abkhaz Lexical Loans in Ubykh). Problemy leksiki i grammatiki jazykov narodov Karachaevo-Cherkesii: Sbornik nauchnyx trudov (Lexical and Grammatical Problems of the Karachay-Cherkessian National Languages: A Scientific Compilation). Cherkessk, 112–124.
 Viacheslav Chirikba (1996). Common West Caucasian. The Reconstruction of its Phonological System and Parts of its Lexicon and Morphology. Leiden: CNWS Publications.
 Colarusso, J. (1994). Proto-Northwest Caucasian (Or How To Crack a Very Hard Nut). Journal of Indo-European Studies 22, 1-17.
 Dumézil, G. (1961). Etudes oubykhs (Ubykh Studies). Paris: Librairie A. Maisonneuve.
 Dumézil, G. (1965). Documents anatoliens sur les langues et les traditions du Caucase (Anatolian Documents on the Languages and Traditions of the Caucasus), III: Nouvelles études oubykhs (New Ubykh Studies). Paris: Librairie A. Maisonneuve.
 Dumézil, G. (1968). Eating Fish Makes You Clever. Annotated recording available via  .
 Dumézil, G. (1975). Le verbe oubykh: études descriptives et comparatives (The Ubykh Verb: Descriptive and Comparative Studies). Paris: Imprimerie Nationale.
 Hewitt, B. G. (2005). North-West Caucasian. Lingua. 115, 91-145.
 Mészáros, J. von. (1930). Die Päkhy-Sprache (The Ubykh Language). Chicago: University of Chicago Press.
 Vogt, H. (1963). Dictionnaire de la langue oubykh (Dictionary of the Ubykh Language). Oslo: Universitetsforlaget.
 Fenwick, R. (2011). A Grammar of Ubykh. Munich: Lincom Europa.

External links
 Two proposals for a practical orthography for Ubykh
 YouTube: Tevfik Esenç narrating the story of the two travellers and the fish in Ubykh
 A number of narrations by Tevfik Esenç, WAV format 
 Ubykh word list and recordings

 
Agglutinative languages
Northwest Caucasian languages
Extinct languages of Europe
Languages of Russia
Languages of Turkey
Vertical vowel systems